The Iran Davis Cup team represent Iran in Davis Cup tennis competition and are governed by the Tennis Federation of Iran.

Iran currently compete in the Asia/Oceania Zone of Group III.

History
Iran competed in its first Davis Cup in 1962.

Current team (2022) 

 Amir Hossein Badi
 Hesam Esmail Yazdi
 Ali Yazdani
 Samyar Elyasi (Junior player)
 Kasra Rahmani (Junior player)

Notable players
 Mansour Bahrami
 Taghi Akbari
 Ezzatollah Nemati
 Nematollah Nemati
 Issa Khodai
 Mohammad Hossein Akbari
 Ali Madani
 Moharram Ali Khodai
 Kamyab Derafshijavan
 Anoosha Shahgholi

Tournaments

Statistics
Since 1959(Last updated 29 August 2017)
Thailand w/o Iran in 1959.
Iran w/o Burma in 1964.
Iran w/o Malaysia in 1967.
Iran w/o Nigeria in 1975.
Turkey w/o Iran in 1985.
Hungary w/o Iran in 1986.

Record
Champion: none
Runner-up: none
Lost in Semifinals: none
Lost in Quarterfinals: none
Lost in First Round: n times

Home and away record (all NN match-ups)
Performance at home (NN match-ups): NN–NN (NN.N%)
Performance away (NN match-ups): NN–NN (NN.N%)
Total: NN–NN (NN.N%)

Head-to-head record (1959–)

Africa
 2-0
 1-0
 0-2 
 Iran w/o
Asia and Oceania
 1-0
 2-0
 0-1
 1-3
 0-2
 0-4

 1-0
 0-1
 1-0
 3-1
 2-5
 4-3
 2-4
 Iran w/o
 1-0
 1-3
 1-1
 3-1

 4-0
 3-0
 4-2
 2-4
 1-2
 4-0
 1-0
 1-1
 3-0 
 3-1
Europe
 0-1

 0-1
 w/o
 0-1
 3-0
 0-1
 0-1
 0-2 
 0-2
 1-0
Americas
 0-1

Results

See also
Davis Cup
Iran Fed Cup team

External links

References

Davis Cup teams
Davis Cup
Davis Cup